Matador Content (also known as Matador) is an American production company founded in 2013 by Jay Peterson and Todd Lubin. The company produces feature films, unscripted television, scripted television and digital programming. Some of Matador's television series include the AMC series Geeking Out, the GSN series Hellevator, the A&E series Epic Ink, Cement Heads, and Country Bucks, the Lifetime series Project Runway: Fashion Startup, the History series Great Minds with Dan Harmon, the Syfy series Cosplay Melee, and the Discovery Channel series The Impossible Row. Matador's scripted programming includes the Emmy Award-winning Netflix original series The Who Was? Show, and Viceland's first scripted series What Would Diplo Do? starring James Van Der Beek.

Matador also produces the larger than life talent show Go-Big Show for TBS, The Kids Tonight Show for Peacock, the Apple TV+ series Dear..., the Disney Channel series Disney Fam Jam hosted by Ariel Martin, Trevor Tordjman, and Phil Wright, the ABC series Boy Band hosted by Rita Ora, the Emmy Award-nominated Paramount Network series Lip Sync Battle hosted by LL Cool J and Chrissy Teigen, and the kid centric spin-off Lip Sync Battle Shorties on Nickelodeon hosted by Nick Cannon and JoJo Siwa.

Matador's feature film credits include the Emmy Award-nominated HBO documentary Banksy Does New York, which premiered at Doc NYC in 2014, Hurricane of Fun: The Making of Wet Hot, a behind-the-scenes look at the 2001 cult indie film Wet Hot American Summer, Give Me Future, which documented Major Lazer's groundbreaking 2016 concert in Havana, Cuba, Wig, the HBO documentary that explores the history of Wigstock, and Billie Eilish: The World's a Little Blurry, the 2021 documentary centered around singer-songwriter Billie Eilish.

Partnerships and acquisition

In 2014, Matador Content formed a joint venture with Untitled Entertainment, the management company behind Jared Leto, Penélope Cruz, and Naomi Watts.

In 2017, Matador Content signed a multi-year production and development deal with Little Creatures, the production company founded by R. J. Cutler and Jane Cha. Later that year, Matador inked a multi-project deal with Bold Soul Studios to develop scripted content.

In 2018, Matador Content was acquired by Boat Rocker Media, a Toronto-based global entertainment company that creates, produces, and distributes premium content and brands for all platforms.

References

External links
 Official website

Television production companies of the United States
American companies established in 2013
Mass media companies established in 2013
2018 mergers and acquisitions
Film production companies of the United States
American subsidiaries of foreign companies